The NXT UK Tag Team Championship was a men's professional wrestling tag team championship that was created and promoted by the American promotion WWE. It was defended on the NXT UK brand division, a sister brand of WWE's developmental territory NXT based in the United Kingdom. Established on 18 June 2018, the inaugural championship team was James Drake and Zack Gibson. On 4 September 2022 at Worlds Collide, the title was unified into the NXT Tag Team Championship, officially retiring the title in the process, with the team of Brooks Jensen and Josh Briggs recognized as the final champions.

History

In a press conference at The O2 Arena on 15 December 2016, the American professional wrestling promotion WWE announced plans to establish a United Kingdom-based brand on which professional wrestlers from the country would compete. The WWE United Kingdom Championship (later renamed NXT United Kingdom Championship) was established that same day, however, it was not until mid-2018 when NXT UK was formally established as the United Kingdom-based brand, and sister brand of the American-based NXT. On 18 June during the first night of the 2018 United Kingdom Championship Tournament, the NXT UK Tag Team Championship, along with the NXT UK Women's Championship, was announced for the NXT UK brand. A four-team single-elimination tournament took place on the 24 and 25 November tapings of NXT UK (aired 2 and 9 January 2019, respectively). The finals occurred at TakeOver: Blackpool on 12 January, where the team of James Drake and Zack Gibson defeated Moustache Mountain (Trent Seven and Tyler Bate) to become the inaugural champions.

In August 2022, WWE announced that the NXT UK brand would go on hiatus and would relaunch as NXT Europe in 2023. As such, NXT UK's championships were unified into their respective NXT championship counterparts. Subsequently, the NXT UK Tag Team Championship was retired on 4 September 2022 at Worlds Collide. At the event, Pretty Deadly (Elton Prince and Kit Wilson) defeated NXT Tag Team Champions The Creed Brothers (Brutus Creed and Julius Creed), Gallus (Mark Coffey and Wolfgang), and reigning NXT UK Tag Team Champions Brooks Jensen and Josh Briggs in a fatal four-way tag team elimination match to unify the NXT UK Tag Team Championship into the NXT Tag Team Championship, with Jensen and Briggs recognized as the final NXT UK Tag Team Champions. Pretty Deadly went forward as the unified NXT Tag Team Champions.

Inaugural tournament

Belt design
The championship belts were unveiled by WWE Chief Operating Officer and NXT head Triple H and NXT UK General Manager Johnny Saint on the 14 October 2018 tapings of NXT UK in Plymouth. The center plate of the championship belts was modeled on the NXT UK logo, which itself took inspiration from the United Kingdom's royal coat of arms, featuring a lion and a horse (instead of the traditional unicorn) with a vertical NXT logo between them; the animals were gold while the logo was silver (the WWE logo was affixed at the center of the X). Above and below the logo were two halves of the globe which were colored blue. A banner above the upper globe read "UK Tag Team" while a banner below the lower globe read "Champions". A gold ornamented border with red jewels circled the center plate. Gold and black divider bars with red jewels at each end separated the center plate from the belt's two side plates. In what became a prominent feature of WWE's championship belts, the side plates featured removable center sections that could be replaced with the reigning champion's logo; the default side plates featured the WWE logo on a blue globe. The plates were on a black leather strap.

Reigns
Over the championship's four-year history, there were seven reigns between seven teams composed of 14 individual champions and one vacancy. James Drake and Zack Gibson were the inaugural champions. Gallus (Mark Coffey and Wolfgang) had the longest reign, lasting 506 days; Flash Morgan Webster and Mark Andrews had the shortest reign at 34 days; Brooks Jensen and Josh Briggs are recognized as the final champions. The oldest champion was Trent Seven, winning the title at 40 years old, while the youngest was Jensen, winning it at 20.

See also 

 Tag team championships in WWE
 Professional wrestling in the United Kingdom

Notes

References

External links

Official NXT UK Tag Team Championship title history

WWE NXT championships
Tag team wrestling championships
National professional wrestling championships
Championship